Clinton is a town in Worcester County, Massachusetts, United States. The population was 15,428 at the 2020 census.

For geographic and demographic information on the census-designated place Clinton, please see the article Clinton (CDP), Massachusetts.

History

Clinton was first settled by Europeans in 1654 as a part of Lancaster. It was officially incorporated as a separate town on March 14, 1850, and named after the DeWitt Clinton Hotel in New York, a favorite place of the town's founders, Erastus Brigham Bigelow and his brother Horatio.

Clinton became an industrialized mill town, using the Nashua River as a source for water power. In 1897, construction began on the Wachusett Dam, culminating in the filling of the Wachusett Reservoir in 1908.  This flooded a substantial portion of Clinton and neighboring towns, which had to be relocated.  A noteworthy feature of the Boston metropolitan public water service was begun in 1896 in the Wachusett lake reservoir at Clinton. The basin excavated there by ten years of labor, lying 385 ft. above high-tide level of Boston harbor, had a capacity of 63,068,000,000 gallons of water and was the largest municipal reservoir in the world in 1911, yet was only part of a system planned for the service of the greater metropolitan area.

Part of the Central Massachusetts Railroad line abandoned in 1958 includes a tunnel near Clamshell Road. Railroads came to the town to serve this industry, including the Boston, Clinton, Fitchburg and New Bedford Railroad (Fitchburg Branch of the Old Colony Railroad), the Central Massachusetts Railroad, and the Worcester, Nashua and Rochester Railroad (the last two later merged into the Boston and Maine Railroad).  By 1890, Clinton was noted for its manufacturing of carpets and woven wire.

Clinton claims to have the oldest continuously-used baseball field in the world, Fuller Field, created in 1878. This challenges the claim by London, Ontario, which argues for Labatt Memorial Park, established as Tecumseh Park in 1877. This is disputed by Clinton because the London field has been flooded and rebuilt twice, including a reorientation of the bases, and there is doubt Tecumseh Field was in continuous use after the 1883 flood. Fuller Field has been the home of the Clinton 76ers, a men's semi-professional baseball team as part of the CNEBA. The Sixers have called Clinton, MA their home for more than two decades and continue to be one of the most dominant teams in the area most recently capturing the 2017 CNEBA title.

Geography
The Nashua River runs through the town, and the large Wachusett Reservoir lies to the south of the town center.

Clinton is bordered by Lancaster to the north, Bolton to the northeast, Berlin to the east, Boylston to the south, and Sterling to the west.

Demographics

The racial makeup of Clinton, Massachusetts is:

As of the census of 2000, there were 13,435 people, 5,597 households, and 3,397 families residing in the town.

The racial makeup of the town was 88.20% White, 2.58% Black or African American, 0.22% Native American, 0.89% Asian, 0.04% Pacific Islander, 5.95% from other races, and 2.13% from two or more races. Hispanic or Latino of any race was 11.60% of the population. Ethnic heritages include Irish, Brazilian, Scottish, German, Québécois, Acadian, Swedish, Italian, Dominican, Puerto Rican, Mexican, Greek, and Polish.  Many emigrants from the Louisburgh area of County Mayo settled in the small town in the early 1900s, giving Clinton a large Irish population till this day.

There were 5,597 households, out of which 28.1% had children under the age of 18 living with them, 43.7% were married couples living together, 12.7% had a female householder with no husband present, and 39.3% were non-families. Of all households, 33.1% were made up of individuals, and 12.4% had someone living alone who was 65 years of age or older. The average household size was 2.38 and the average family size was 3.06.

In the town, the population was spread out, with 23.0% under the age of 18, 7.8% from 18 to 24, 32.9% from 25 to 44, 21.3% from 45 to 64, and 15.0% who were 65 years of age or older. The median age was 37 years. For every 100 females, there were 92.9 males. For every 100 females age 18 and over, there were 89.6 males.

The median income for a household in the town was $44,740, and the median income for a family was $53,308. Males had a median income of $37,263 versus $30,035 for females. The per capita income for the town was $22,764. About 4.9% of families and 7.1% of the population were below the poverty line, including 5.4% of those under age 18 and 13.9% of those ages 65 or over.

Government

Library

The public library in Clinton opened in 1873. In fiscal year 2008, the town of Clinton spent 0.99% ($325,383) of its budget on its public library—approximately $23 per person.

Education

Clinton Public Schools

Clinton Elementary School (K–4)

Clinton Middle School (5–8)

Clinton High School (9–12)

Notable people

 Mike Bonin, Los Angeles City Councilor
 Clarence Brown, film director
 Joseph E. Casey, lawyer and former US Representative
 Fred J. Douglas, former US Congressman
 Tim Fortugno, former Major League Baseball pitcher
 Carroll Gibbons, musician
 Joseph L. Gormley, chief of chemistry and toxicology for the FBI
 Sliding Billy Hamilton, member of Baseball Hall of Fame
 Mal Kittridge, baseball player
 Gordon Lankton, Chairman of Nypro, Member of the Plastics hall of fame and founder of the Museum of Russian Icons
 Agnes Moorehead, actress
 Frank O'Malley, English professor
 Philip J. Philbin, former US Congressman
 Jimmy Ryan, major league baseball player
 Sydney Schanberg, Pulitzer Prize–winning reporter
 David Walsh, former Massachusetts governor
 Scott Young, former professional ice hockey player

Sites of interest
 Central Park
 Clinton Business District
 Fuller Field
 Museum of Russian Icons
 South Meadow and Mossy Ponds
 Wachusett Reservoir Clinton Dam

See also
 Clinton High School (Clinton, Massachusetts)
 List of mill towns in Massachusetts

References

Further reading 
  On baseball pitcher Tim O'Keefe and the town's Fuller Field, the oldest baseball field in continuous use.

External links

 Town of Clinton official website
 Clintonmass.com, community website
 A Town Called Clinton, short film created by former residents Billy and Patrick McNally

 
Towns in Massachusetts
Towns in Worcester County, Massachusetts